Vermillion ("The Place Where Vermilion is Obtained") is a city in and the county seat of Clay County. It is in the southeastern corner of South Dakota, United States, and is the state's 12th-largest city. According to the 2020 Census, the population was 11,695. The city lies atop a bluff near the Missouri River.

The area has been home to Native American tribes for centuries. French fur traders first visited in the late 18th century. Vermillion was founded in 1859 and incorporated in 1873. The name refers to the Lakota name: wa sa wak pa'la (red stream). Home to the University of South Dakota, Vermillion has a mixed academic and rural character: the university is a major academic institution for the state, with its only law and medical schools and its only AACSB-accredited business school. Major farm products include corn, soybeans, and alfalfa.

History
Lewis and Clark camped at the mouth of the Vermillion River near the present-day town on August 24, 1804. The previous day, they had killed their first bison; the next day, they climbed Spirit Mound. In May 1843, John James Audubon visited the Vermillion ravine to view the bird life. The town was considered for the site of South Dakota's first mental institution (now the Human Services Center) in 1873, but the hospital was eventually awarded to nearby Yankton. The original town was entirely below the bluffs on the banks of the Missouri River, and three-quarters of it washed away in the Great Flood of 1881.

William Jennings Bryan and William Howard Taft—candidates for the U.S. presidency in the 1908 election—spoke in Vermillion on September 28 and 29, 1908, respectively. Along with Eugene Chafin, they toured South Dakota by train, including stops in Mitchell, Tripp, Yankton, and Elk Point.

John Philip Sousa conducted the Sousa Band on October 26, 1926, at the facility that in 1929 became known as Slagle Auditorium.

On March 24, 1967, in Vermillion, Thomas James White Hawk and William Stands murdered jeweler James Yeado and raped his wife.

Geography

Climate

Government
Vermillion operates under the council-manager form of government. Its governing body has nine members. Eight City Council members are elected from four wards, with two members representing each ward. The Mayor is elected at-large and presides over City Council meetings. The mayor may vote on all matters coming before the governing body. With the consent of the City Council, the mayor appoints individuals to serve on the Library Board and Planning Commission. The Library Board oversees the operations of the Vermillion Public Library and appoints a Library Director. All services and programs provided by the library are overseen by the board. The Planning Commission is charged with overseeing the long-range planning of the community, including zoning issues, subdivisions and formulation of the Comprehensive Plan. The Planning Commission serves a vital role in recommending major policy changes to the governing body for the development of the community.

Demographics

2020 census
As of the census of 2020, there were 11,695 people, 3,895 households, and 1,771 families residing in the city. The racial makeup of the city was 86.6% White, 2.3% African American, 3.8% Native American, 3.7% Asian, 3.3% from other races, and 2.3% from two or more races. Hispanic or Latino of any race were 3.4% of the population.

There were 3,895 households, of which 20.2% had children under the age of 18 living with them, 32.8% were married couples living together, 8.4% had a female householder with no husband present, 3.2% had a male householder with no wife present, and 55.6% were non-families. 35.3% of all households were made up of individuals, and 7.5% had someone living alone who was 65 years of age or older. The average household size was 2.21 and the average family size was 2.90.

The median age in the city was 23.4 years. 15.3% of residents were under the age of 18; 41.1% were between the ages of 18 and 24; 20.7% were from 25 to 44; 14.4% were from 45 to 64; and 8.4% were 65 years of age or older. The gender makeup of the city was 47.8% male and 52.2% female.

2000 census
As of the census of 2000, there were 9,765 people, 3,647 households, and 1,801 families residing in the city. The population density was 2,549.3 people per square mile (984.4/km2). There were 3,967 housing units at an average density of 1,035.6 per square mile (399.9/km2). The racial makeup of the city was 90.95% White, 1.29% African American, 3.37% Native American, 2.46% Asian, 0.01% Pacific Islander, 0.37% from other races, and 1.56% from two or more races. 1.07% of the population were Hispanic or Latino of any race.

There were 3,647 households, out of which 25.8% had children under the age of 18 living with them, 37.5% were married couples living together, 9.2% had a female householder with no husband present, and 50.6% were non-families. 34.1% of all households were made up of individuals, and 7.8% had someone living alone who was 65 years of age or older. The average household size was 2.24 and the average family size was 2.90.

In the city, the population was spread out, with 17.5% under the age of 18, 36.2% from 18 to 24, 24.5% from 25 to 44, 13.4% from 45 to 64, and 8.4% who were 65 years of age or older. The median age was 24 years. For every 100 females, there were 91.6 males. For every 100 females age 18 and over, there were 89.9 males.

As of 2000 the median income for a household in the city was $24,095, and the median income for a family was $40,109. Males had a median income of $28,180 versus $20,975 for females. The per capita income for the city was $13,909. 26.2% of the population and 16.2% of families were below the poverty line. Out of the total people living in poverty, 19.0% are under the age of 18 and 14.8% are 65 or older.

For the population 25 years and over, 90.7% have a high school education or higher; 45.4% have a bachelor's degree or higher; and 21.2% have a graduate or professional degree.

For ancestries, 36% claim German ancestry; 14.2% Norwegian; 13.4% Irish; 6.6% English; 5.5% Dutch; and 4% Swedish.

Major employers

Parks
Vermillion's nine parks, totaling , include several major city parks: Prentis Park, Cotton Park, Barstow Park, and Lions Park. Lions Park offers camping. Prentis Park includes a new swimming pool opened in 2017, with a waterslide, diving board, shallow play area, "lazy river", and snack bar. The park also features a disc golf course and a baseball diamond which was the home of the Vermillion Grey Sox, of the South Dakota Amateur Baseball Association. The baseball field is currently home of the Vermillion High School, Post 1 American Legion, University of South Dakota club, and VFW teams. The city owns and operates The Bluffs Golf Course, an 18-hole championship golf course that overlooks the river bluffs. Vermillion also offers a bike trail along the Vermillion River and several neighborhood parks: Bliss Park, JC Park, Ty Park, Bluffs Park, and Rotary Park.

Museums
The University of South Dakota's National Music Museum (NMM) is accredited by the American Alliance of Museums in Washington, D.C., and is recognized as "A Landmark of American Music" by the National Music Council. It includes more than 15,000 American, European, and non-Western instruments.

Murals 
Vermillion has five murals in the downtown business district, three of which are community-based. All three community murals are painted on the Coyote Twin Theater building; the first was painted in 2017, the second in 2019, and the third in 2020. The first mural, "Painting the Town", was designed as the first mural for the Vermillion Community Mural Project by Amber Hansen, a painting professor at the University of South Dakota.

During the summers of 2019 and 2020, Reyna Hernandez was the lead artist on two murals on the Coyote Twin Building that form a larger cohesive mural. Hernandez, of the Yankton-Sioux Tribe, was assisted by Elizabeth Skye of the Standing Rock Sioux Tribe. Inkpa Mani led group discussions to help create imagery centered around Native Americans and Native American creation stories.

Notable people
 Rachael Bella, actress
 Joseph Bottum, writer
 Kevin Brady, U.S. representative
 Shawn Colvin, singer-songwriter
 Doug Dickey, college football coach
 Carl Gunderson, former governor of South Dakota
 Jon Hoadley, Michigan state legislator
 Chelsea Houska, television personality (Teen Mom 2)
 Jeanne Ives, Illinois state representative
 Frances Kelsey, physician-scientist
 Tim Johnson, U.S. senator
 John L. Jolley, U.S. representative
 Jeff Kidder, lawman
 Ben Leber, NFL football linebacker
 Andrew E. Lee, South Dakota's third governor
 Paradise Fears, alternative pop-rock band
 Byron S. Payne, Attorney General of South Dakota
 Billy Yost, musician
 Todd Tiahrt, U.S. representative
 Abby Whiteside, piano teacher and theorist

Media

AM radio

FM radio

Sister city
Ratingen in the German state of North Rhine-Westphalia has been Vermillion's sister city since 1969.

See also
 List of cities in South Dakota

References

External links

 
 Vermillion Plain Talk - local newspaper

 
Cities in South Dakota
Cities in Clay County, South Dakota
County seats in South Dakota
Populated places established in 1859
Micropolitan areas of South Dakota
1859 establishments in the United States